Gerald Davis (born December 12, 1985) is a professional Canadian football offensive lineman who is currently a free agent. He is also currently a graduate assistant at Augustana College. He was signed by the Hamilton Tiger-Cats as a street free agent in 2008. He played college football for the Valdosta State Blazers.

Davis has also been a member of the Edmonton Eskimos.

References

External links
Augustana College profile

1985 births
Living people
American players of Canadian football
Canadian football offensive linemen
Valdosta State Blazers football players
Hamilton Tiger-Cats players
Edmonton Elks players
People from Greensboro, Georgia
Players of American football from Georgia (U.S. state)
Sioux Falls Storm players
Billings Outlaws players